Killer Fish is an Italian-French-Brazilian horror film directed by Antonio Margheriti.

Plot
The mastermind behind a precision theft of priceless emeralds decides to hide the jewels at the bottom of a reservoir he has secretly stocked with savage deadly piranha. Retrieving the gems turns out to be a caper in itself since the group is now torn by suspicion and jealousy. Several gang members try to recover the loot on their own, only to become screaming victims of the insatiable horde of killer fish. The treasure is down there just waiting to be brought up. To get them, everyone must face the inescapable terror of thousands of man-eating creatures.

Cast
 Lee Majors as Robert Lasky
 Karen Black as Kate Neville 
 Margaux Hemingway as Gabrielle
 Marisa Berenson as Ann
 James Franciscus as Paul Diller
 Roy Brocksmith as Ollie
 Dan Pastorini as Hans
 Frank Pesce as Warren Bailey
 Charles Guardino as Lloyd Bailey
 Anthony Steffen as Max
 Fábio Sabag as Quintin
 Gary Collins as Tom

Filming
The film was made on location in the city of Angra dos Reis, Rio de Janeiro, Brazil.

Reception
The Monthly Film Bulletin stated that the film "appears to have a greater budget than Piranha" and that it "exhibits considerably less imagination". Vincent Canby of The New York Times stated that the film "may not be a good movie — it's really inept—but it's friendly, like Mr. Majors's quizzical squint, which is, I'm told by people who watch more television than I do, what Mr. Majors does best. Everyone, in fact, carries on gamely, as people do at a picnic when it rains."

Legacy
The film is one of six movies featured in Season 12 of Mystery Science Theater 3000: The Gauntlet.

The film was broadcast on Tele 5 as part of the programme format SchleFaZ in season 1.

References

External links

 

1979 horror films
1979 films
Brazilian horror films
French heist films
French horror films
Italian heist films
Italian horror films
Natural horror films
Films about piranhas
Films directed by Antonio Margheriti
Films scored by Guido & Maurizio De Angelis
Films shot in Rio de Janeiro (state)
ITC Entertainment films
English-language Brazilian films
English-language French films
English-language Italian films
1970s Italian films
1970s French films